St. Anthony High School is a private, Roman Catholic high school located in Long Beach, California. It is served by the Roman Catholic Archdiocese of Los Angeles.

History

St. Anthony High School was founded as a Catholic coeducational high school in 1920 by the Sisters of the Immaculate Heart and St. Anthony Parish. In 1940, the Brothers of Holy Cross joined the Sisters on campus and St. Anthony became a boys' school and a girls' school with facilities dedicated to each on the same campus. In 1972 the two schools merged and St. Anthony became coeducational once again.  Today, St. Anthony High School is an Archdiocesan high school and remains a co-ed school.

Notable alumni
Dave Adlesh (1962), professional baseball player for the Houston Astros
Joey Amalfitano (1951), professional baseball player and coach
Lou Berberet (1947), professional baseball player
Ernie Cheatham (1947), professional football player
Cormac Carney (1977), judge of the United States District Court for the Central District of California
Tiare Jennings (2020), college softball player
William Levada (1954), cardinal of the Roman Catholic Church
Dan Lungren (1964), former U.S. Congressman, and Attorney General of California from 1991 to 1999.
Darrick Martin (1988), professional basketball player
George Niederauer (1954), former Roman Catholic Archbishop of San Francisco
Johnny Olszewski (1949), professional football player
Jack Snow (1961), professional football player
Manu Tuiasosopo(1976), professional football player
Curtis Weaver (2016), professional football player for the Miami Dolphins

References

External links
St. Anthony High School's Website

High schools in Long Beach, California
Roman Catholic secondary schools in Los Angeles County, California
Educational institutions established in 1920
Catholic secondary schools in California
1920 establishments in California